CNBC World is an American pay television business news channel operated by the NBCUniversal News Group which provides coverage of world markets alongside the domestic CNBC service, using programmes from CNBC's international networks based in Europe, Asia, India, and other regions served by a domestic CNBC channel or affiliate. Effectively, this makes the network's prime time timeslot the graveyard slot, due to time zone differences, when it simulcasts live programming from their overseas sister networks. During U.S. trading hours covered by the main CNBC network, several other pre-taped shows from CNBC's different international channels (e.g. CNBC-TV18 and CNBC Indonesia) are also seen on the channel, along with CNBC Prime reality programming such as American Greed and other CNBC specials are shown, in order to force viewers to tune in to the main CNBC service for business information outside the Eurasian market days.

As of 2020, the network is not offered in high definition by most providers, and the only way to watch CNBC's international networks in that format in the United States is through the premium monthly/yearly streaming service, "CNBC Pro", as most providers offer it only as a standard definition offering.

Before 2001, CNBC Asia's coverage was seen on American cable via the International Channel, both before and after that network's merger with Asia Business News.

Programming 
 Asia Squawk Box
 Street Signs Asia
 Capital Connection
 Squawk Box Europe
 Street Signs Europe
 Worldwide Exchange
 Decision Time (CNBC Europe's monthly programme covering the UK and ECB bank lending rates announcements)
 American Greed

See also
 CNN International

References

External links
 Official Site

 
CNBC global channels
Television channels and stations established in 2001
English-language television stations in the United States
Business-related television channels